The Thracian language is an extinct and poorly attested language, spoken in ancient times in Southeast Europe by the Thracians. The linguistic affinities of the Thracian language are poorly understood, but it is generally agreed that it was an Indo-European language with satem features.

A contemporary, neighboring language, Dacian is usually regarded as closely related to Thracian. However, there is insufficient evidence with respect to either language to ascertain the nature of this relationship.

The point at which Thracian became extinct is a matter of dispute. However, it is generally accepted that Thracian was still in use in the 6th century AD: Antoninus of Piacenza wrote in 570 that there was a monastery in the Sinai, at which the monks spoke Greek, Latin, Syriac, Egyptian, and Bessian – a Thracian dialect.

Other theories about Thracian remain controversial. A classification put forward by some linguists, such as Harvey Mayer, suggests that Thracian (and Dacian) belonged to the Baltic branch of Indo-European, or at least is closer to Baltic than any other Indo-European branch. However, this theory has not achieved the status of a general consensus among linguists. These are among many competing hypotheses regarding the classification and fate of Thracian.

Geographic distribution 
The Thracian language or languages were spoken in what is now Bulgaria, Romania, North Macedonia, Northern Greece, European Turkey and in parts of Bithynia (North-Western Asiatic Turkey).

Modern-day Eastern Serbia is usually considered by paleolinguists to have been a Daco-Moesian language area. Moesian (after Vladimir Georgiev et al.) is grouped with the Dacian language.

Remnants of the Thracian language 

Little is known for certain about the Thracian languages, since no phrase beyond a few words in length has been satisfactorily deciphered, and the sounder decipherments given for the shorter phrases may not be completely accurate. Some of the longer inscriptions may indeed be Thracian in origin but they may not reflect actual Thracian language sentences, but rather jumbles of names or magical formulas.

Enough Thracian lexical items have survived to show that Thracian was a member of the Indo-European language family and that it was a satemized language by the time it is attested.
Besides the aforementioned inscriptions, Thracian is attested through personal names, toponyms, hydronyms, phytonyms, divine names, etc. and by a small number of words cited in Ancient Greek texts as being specifically Thracian.

Other ancient Greek lexical items were not specifically identified as Thracian by the ancient Greeks but are hypothesized by paleolinguists as being or probably being of Thracian origin. Other lexical items are hypothesized on the basis of local anthroponyms, toponyms, hydronyms, oronyms, etc. mentioned in primary sources (see also List of ancient cities in Thrace and Dacia, List of Dacian plant names).

Below is a table showing both words cited as being Thracian in classical sources, and lexical elements that have been extracted by paleolinguists from Thracian anthroponyms, toponyms, etc. In this table the closest cognates are shown, with an emphasis on cognates in Bulgarian, Albanian, Baltic, Slavic, Greek, and substratum and/or old-layer words in the Eastern Romance languages: Romanian, Aromanian, et cetera. See also the List of reconstructed Dacian words.

Significant cognates from any Indo-European language are listed. However, not all lexical items in Thracian are assumed to be from the Proto-Indo-European language, some non-IE lexical items in Thracian are to be expected.

There are 23 words mentioned by ancient sources considered explicitly of Thracian origin and known meaning.

An additional 180 Thracian words have been reconstructed.

The proposed Thracian words in the Ancient Greek lexicon are not numerous. They include the parth- element in Parthenon; balios ("dappled"; < PIE *bhel-, "to shine", Bul. bel/bial (бял) "white" or bljaskav 'bright, shiny'; Pokorny also cites Illyrian as a possible source, the non-Greek origin is argued on phonological grounds), bounos, "hill, mound".

The Thracian horseman hero was an important figure in Thracian religion, mythology, and culture. Depictions of the Thracian Horseman are found in numerous archaeological remains and artifacts from Thracian regions. From the Duvanlii ring and from cognates in numerous Indo-European languages,  is seen to be a Thracian word for "horse", deriving from PIE *mend-.

The early Indo-European languages had more than one word for horse; for example Latin had equus from PIE *ekwo- and mannus ("a pony") from another IE root, later receiving cabalus as a loanword.

In many cases in current Thracology, there is more than one etymology for a Thracian lexical item. For example, Thracian Diana Germetitha (Diana is from Latin while the epithet Germetitha is from Thracian) has two different proposed etymologies, "Diana of the warm bosom" (Olteanu; et al.?) or "Diana of the warm radiance" (Georgiev; et al.?). In other cases, etymologies for the Thracian lexical items may be sound, but some of the proposed cognates are not actually cognates, thus confusing the affinity of Thracian.

Inscriptions 
The following are the longest inscriptions preserved. The remaining ones are mostly single words or names on vessels and other artifacts.

Ezerovo inscription 

Only four Thracian inscriptions of any length have been found. The first is a gold ring found in 1912 in the village of Ezerovo (Plovdiv Province of Bulgaria); the ring was dated to the 5th century BC. On the ring an inscription is found written in a Greek script and consisting of 8 lines, the eighth of which is located on the edge, the rim, of the rotating disk; it reads without any spaces between:

as Dimitar Dechev (Germanised as D. Detschew) separates the words thus

i.e.

proposing the following translation:
I am Rolisteneas, a descendant of Nereneas; Tilezypta, an Arazian woman, delivered me to the ground.

Kyolmen inscription 

A second inscription, hitherto undeciphered, was found in 1965 near the village of Kyolmen, Varbitsa Municipality, dating to the sixth century BC. Written in a Greek alphabet variant, it is possibly a tomb stele inscription similar to the Phrygian ones; Peter A. Dimitrov's transcription thereof is:

ΙΛΑΣΝΛΕΤΕΔΝΛΕΔΝΕΝΙΔΑΚΑΤΡΟΣΟ
ΕΒΑ·ΡΟΖΕΣΑΣΝΗΝΕΤΕΣΑΙΓΕΚΟΑ
ΝΒΛΑΒΑΗΓΝ
i.e.
ilasnletednlednenidakatroso
eba·rozesasnēnetesaigekoa
nblabaēgn

Duvanlii inscription 
A third inscription is again on a ring, found in Duvanlii, Kaloyanovo Municipality, next to the left hand of a skeleton. It dates to the 5th century BC. The ring has the image of a horseman with the inscription surrounding the image. It is only partly legible (16 out of the initial 21):
ΗΥΖΙΗ.....ΔΕΛΕ / ΜΕΖΗΝΑΙ
i.e.
ēuziē.....dele / mezēnai

The meaning of the inscription is 'Horseman Eusie protect!'

If this reading is correct, the Thracian word mezenai might be cognate to Illyrian Menzanas (as in "Juppiter/Jove Menzanas" 'Juppiter of the foals' or 'Juppiter on a horse'); Albanian mëz 'foal'; Romanian mînz 'colt, foal'; Latin mannus 'small horse, pony'; Gaulish manduos 'pony' (as in tribe name Viromandui 'men who own ponies').

Classification 

The Thracian language in linguistic textbooks is usually treated either as its own branch of Indo-European, or is grouped with Dacian, together forming a Daco-Thracian branch of IE. Older textbooks often grouped it also with Illyrian or Phrygian. The belief that Thracian was close to Phrygian is no longer popular and has mostly been discarded.

No definite evidence has yet been found that demonstrates that Thracian or Daco-Thracian belonged on the same branch as Albanian or Baltic or Balto-Slavic or Greco-Macedonian or Phrygian or any other IE branch. For this reason textbooks still treat Thracian as its own branch of Indo-European, or as a Daco-Thracian/Thraco-Dacian branch.

The generally accepted clades branched from the Proto-Indo-European language are, in alphabetical order, the Proto-Albanian language, Proto-Anatolian language, Proto-Armenian language, Proto-Balto-Slavic language, Proto-Celtic language, Proto-Germanic language, Proto-Greek language, Proto-Indo-Iranian language, Proto-Italic language, and the Proto-Tocharian language. Thracian, Dacian, Phrygian, Illyrian, Venetic, and Paeonian are fragmentarily attested and cannot be reliably categorized.

Note: Asterisk indicates reconstructed IE sound. M is a cover symbol for the row of voiced stops (mediae), T for unvoiced stops (tenues) and TA for aspirated stops (tenues aspiratae). ∅ indicates zero, a sound that has been lost.

Thraco-Dacian has been hypothesized as forming a branch of Indo-European along with Baltic.

For a large proportion of the 300 Thracian geographic names there are cognates within the Baltic toponymy, most similarities between Thracian and Balto-Slavic personal and geographic names were found, especially Baltic. According to Duridinov the "most important impression make the geographic cognates of Baltic and Thracian" "the similarity of these parallels stretching frequently on the main element and the suffix simultaneously, which makes a strong impression". According to him there are occasional similarities between Slavic and Thracian because Slavic is related to Baltic, while almost no lexical similarities within Thracian and Phrygian were found. This significant relatedness show close affinity and kinship of Thracian with Baltic.

The following table shows the cognate Thracian and Baltic place names, some Polish and related Lechitic names from the transitional area of the ancient Veneti-Eneti along the Amber Road were added:

Fate of the Thracians and their language 
According to Skordelis, when Thracians were subjected by Alexander the Great they finally assimilated to Greek culture and became as Greek as Spartans and Athenians, although he considered the Thracian language as a form of Greek. According to Crampton (1997) most Thracians were eventually Hellenized or Romanized, with the last remnants surviving in remote areas until the 5th century. According to Marinov the Thracians were likely completely Romanized and Hellenized after the last contemporary references to them of the 6th century. This theory holds the Christianization of the Roman Empire as the main factor of immediate assimilation.

A quick extinction would intensely contrast the avoidance of Hellenization at least by Albanian till the present, possibly with the help of isolated mountainous areas.

Another author considers that the interior of Thrace have never been Romanized or Hellenized (Trever, 1939). This was followed also by Slavonization. According to Weithmann (1978) when the Slavs migrated, they encountered only a very superficially Romanized Thracian and Dacian population, which had not strongly identified itself with Imperial Rome, while Greek and Roman populations (mostly soldiers, officials, merchants) abandoned the land or were killed. Because Pulpudeva survived as Plovdiv in Slavic languages, not under Philippopolis, some authors suggest that Thracian was not completely obliterated in the 7th century.

See also 
Dacian language
List of reconstructed Dacian words
Thraco-Illyrian
Illyrian languages
Paeonian language
Phrygian language
Ancient Macedonian language
Thraco-Roman
Paleo-Balkan languages
Proto-Indo-European language
Proto-Albanian language
Proto-Balto-Slavic language
Proto-Greek language

Footnotes

References

Further reading 

 
 
 
 
 Duridanov, Ivan (1969). Die Thrakisch- und Dakisch-Baltischen Sprachbeziehungen [Thracian and Dacian Baltic Language Contacts]. Other. Verlag der Bulgarischen Akademie der Wissenschaften, Sofia.
 
Georgiev, V. I. Introduction to the History of the Indo-European Languages. Sofia: 1981.
Holst, J. H. "Armenische Studien". Wiesbaden: 2009.
 Accessed July 7, 2021. 
 
 
 
 Russu, I. I. Limba Traco-Dacilor / Die Sprache der Thrako-Daker, Bucharest (1967, 1969).

External links 
The Language of the Thracians, an English translation of Ivan Duridanov's 1975 essay Ezikyt na trakite
Thracian glossary
Palaeolexicon – Word study tool of ancient languages (including Thracian dictionary)

Thracian language
Paleo-Balkan languages
Extinct languages of Europe
Languages of ancient Macedonia
Languages of ancient Thrace
Languages of ancient Anatolia
Languages extinct in the 5th century
Unclassified Indo-European languages